Ali Hamadeh (born 5 September 1974) is a former professional tennis player from Memphis, Tennessee in the United States who competed for Lebanon.

Hamadeh and partner, Mahesh Bhupathi, were NCAA double's champions in 1995, while at the University of Mississippi. He was a 2 Time All-American and 3 Time All SEC honors during his collegiate career.  He was ranked #1 in the NCAA Doubles National Rankings (1995) and #6 in the NCAA Singles National Rankings (1996).  He won the 1994 SEC Doubles Championships with Joakim Appleqvist.

Professionally, he partnered with Bhupathi in the US Open and defeated the combination of Mark Keil and Peter Nyborg in the opening round. They were then eliminated in the second round by Byron Black and Jonathan Stark.

Although born in the United States, Hamadeh represented Lebanon in the Davis Cup. He appeared in 20 ties for his country. He won 30 of his 44 matches, 18 of them in singles, both of which are national records.

Challenger Titles

Doubles: (1)

References

External links
Tennis Academy in Beirut (Managed by Ali Hamadeh)

1974 births
Living people
American people of Lebanese descent
Lebanese male tennis players
Ole Miss Rebels men's tennis players
Sportspeople from Memphis, Tennessee
Tennis people from Tennessee
Tennis players at the 1998 Asian Games
Asian Games competitors for Lebanon
Sportspeople of Lebanese descent